The Baptist Argus (renamed The Baptist World in 1909) was published in Louisville, Kentucky between the years 1897 and 1919. The Argus/World published information on the activities of the Baptist church, from missionary appointments to changes in pastoral guidance at the local level and major actions of the statewide conferences.

Digitization by Baylor University 
In the fall of 2014, the Digital Projects Group of the Baylor University Electronic Library digitized a full run of The Baptist Argus / The Baptist World and placed it online via their Digital Collections site. The physical copies of the Argus/World were loaned to Baylor University by the Southern Baptist Theological Seminary. The collection is full-text searchable and contains every printed issue from 1897 to 1919.

References

External links 
 The Baptist Argus / The Baptist World from the Baylor University Digital Collections

Defunct newspapers published in Louisville, Kentucky
Publications established in 1897
Publications disestablished in 1919
Baptist newspapers
1897 establishments in Kentucky
1919 disestablishments in Kentucky